is a Japanese light novel series written by Miya Kinojo and illustrated by Katagiri. The series was initially serialized on the user-generated novel publishing website Shōsetsuka ni Narō between 2016 and 2019. It was later acquired by Overlap who began to publish it as a light novel in December 2016 under their Overlap Novels imprint. A manga adaptation illustrated by Akine Itomachi began serialization in Overlap's Comic Gardo website in January 2019.

Media

Light novel
Written by Miya Kinojo, the series was serialized on the user-generated novel publishing website Shōsetsuka ni Narō from 2016 to 2019, when Kinojo stopped posting on the site. The series was later acquired by Overlap who began publishing it as a light novel with illustrations by Katagiri under their Overlap Novels imprint on December 25, 2016. As of January 25, 2023, fifteen volumes have been released. The light novels are licensed in North America by J-Novel Club.

Manga
A manga adaptation by Akine Itomachi began serialization in Overlap's Comic Gardo website in January 2019. As of January 25, 2023, the manga has been collected in eight volumes. The manga adaptation is licensed in North America by Seven Seas Entertainment.

References

External links
 
 

2016 Japanese novels
Anime and manga based on light novels
Comedy anime and manga
Fantasy anime and manga
Isekai anime and manga
Isekai novels and light novels
J-Novel Club books
Japanese fantasy novels
Japanese webcomics
Light novels
Light novels first published online
Romantic comedy anime and manga
Seven Seas Entertainment titles
Shōnen manga
Shōsetsuka ni Narō
Webcomics in print